Bridge City is an unincorporated community and census-designated place (CDP) in Jefferson Parish, Louisiana, United States. It was established in the 1930s during the construction of the Huey P. Long Bridge over the Mississippi River. The town is located on the south side (referred to as the "West Bank") of the river. It is part of the New Orleans–Metairie–Kenner metropolitan statistical area.

The Bridge City CDP population was 7,706 at the 2010 census. At the 2019 American Community Survey, its population declined to 6,602 residents. The population of Bridge City rebounded to 7,219 in 2020.

Geography
Bridge City is located on the east side of Jefferson Parish at  (29.923956, -90.166030). The community is bordered to the northeast, across the Mississippi, by New Orleans in Orleans Parish. The remaining neighbors of Bridge City are all within Jefferson Parish: Elmwood and Jefferson to the north across the Mississippi, Avondale to the southwest, and Westwego to the southeast.

Bridge City is the home of the Avondale Shipyard.

Demographics

The 2019 American Community Survey estimated 6,602 people lived in the CDP, down from 7,706 at the 2010 United States census. In 2020, its population rebounded to 7,219. In 2019, the racial and ethnic makeup was 46.8% African American, 32.6% non-Hispanic white, 0.1% Native American, 3.1% Asian, 7.9% some other race, 1.7% two or more races, and 15.9% Hispanic and Latino American of any race. The median household income was $31,711 and 26.5% of the population lived at or below the poverty line. By the time of the 2020 census, its racial and ethnic makeup was 43.33% Black or African American, 27.46% non-Hispanic white, 0.44% Native American, 2.49% Asian, 0.03% Pacific Islander, 3.03% multiracial or of some other race, and 23.22% Hispanic and Latino American of any race; state and nationwide, this has reflected the demographic shift in American racial and ethnic identity as the U.S. began to experience non-Hispanic white demographic decline.

Festival

Bridge City is host to Louisiana's annual Gumbo Festival.

Government and infrastructure
Bridge City is an unincorporated area of Jefferson Parish. Bridge City comes under the Jefferson Parish government. Bridge City is in the Third District Jefferson Parish Sheriff's Office. The Bridge City Fire Department is District 70. The Bridge City Center for Youth, a juvenile correctional facility for boys operated by the Louisiana Office of Juvenile Justice, is in Bridge City.

Education
The area's public schools are operated by the Jefferson Parish Public School System.

Most areas of the city are zoned to Mildred S. Harris Elementary School (formerly Bridge City Elementary School) in Bridge City. The school was given its current name, after the founding principal of the school, in 2012. Members of the family of the founding principal and former student Nedra Cassard had campaigned to have the school renamed, and the district voted in favor of renaming. The school was founded in 1952. Myrtle C. Thibodeaux Elementary School (formerly Westwego Elementary School) in Westwego and Catherine Strehle Elementary School in Avondale serve portions of Bridge City.

Secondary schools that serve the city include:
 Henry Ford Middle School in Avondale
 L.W. Higgins High School (unincorporated Jefferson Parish) in Marrero

In regards to advanced studies academies, residents are zoned to the Marrero Academy.

References

External links

Mildred S. Harris Elementary School

Census-designated places in Louisiana
Census-designated places in Jefferson Parish, Louisiana
Census-designated places in New Orleans metropolitan area
Louisiana populated places on the Mississippi River